Florence Maheu (born 6 March 1993) is a Canadian slalom canoeist who has competed at the international level since 2012. 
She is from Salaberry-de-Valleyfield, Quebec and trains with Kayak Valleyfield.

Maheu represented Canada for the first time at the 2012 U23 World Championships in Wausau, where she finished 21st individually and 5th in the team event. She would compete at the U23 Worlds four more times from 2013 to 2016. In 2017 she won her first national title and finished as top Canadian at her first Senior World Championships in Pau. She finished in a career-best 13th place at the 2018 World Cup in Liptovský Mikuláš.

At the 2019 World Championships, Maheu's placement clinched a spot for Canada in the women's K1 at the 2020 Tokyo Olympics. She secured that spot for herself during the Australian Canoe Slalom Championships in January 2020 after finishing atop the rankings for the domestic selection process. She finished 23rd in the 2020 Olympic K1 event after being eliminated in the semifinal.

Florence has studied a Bachelor of Kinesiology at Université de Montréal. She is coached by Anthony Colin and 1995 C2 world champion Michał Staniszewski.

References

External links 

 

Living people
1993 births
Canadian female canoeists
Sportspeople from Salaberry-de-Valleyfield
Florence Maheu
Canoeists at the 2020 Summer Olympics
Olympic canoeists of Canada
21st-century Canadian LGBT people